William Passavant Gerberding (September 9, 1929December 27, 2014) was an American educator. He served as president of the University of Washington, and as Chancellor of the University of Illinois at Urbana-Champaign.

Biography
Gerberding was born in Fargo, North Dakota. He was the youngest of four children born to Lutheran minister William Gerberding and  his wife Esther Habighorst. He received his BA from  Macalester College in 1951, and went on to earn an MA in 1956 and a Ph.D. in 1959 from the University of Chicago. 

Gerberding was a professor at Colgate University, and at UCLA, where he was chairman of the political science department. He served as vice president of academic affairs at Occidental College in 1972.  He was chancellor of the University of Illinois at Urbana-Champaign and executive vice-chancellor at UCLA.

Gerberding served as the 27th president of the University of Washington in Seattle between 1979 and 1995.  His 16 years of service is the longest term of any president in the history of the university.  He died at the age of 85 on December 27, 2014.

Memorials
In 1995, the 1949-built Administration Building at the University of Washington was renamed Gerberding Hall in his honor.

References

External links

Biography 
The View From The Top
Portrait of William P. Gerberding by Margaret Holland Sargent

1929 births
2014 deaths
People from Fargo, North Dakota
Macalester College alumni
University of Chicago alumni
Colgate University faculty
Presidents of the University of Washington
Leaders of the University of Illinois